George F. Shafer (November 23, 1888August 13, 1948) was an American politician who served as the 17th Governor of North Dakota, serving from 1929 to 1932.

Biography
Shafer was educated in Mandan's public school system and attended the University of North Dakota.  He married Frances Kellog on September 1, 1915, and they had three sons, George F. Jr., Richard K., and Charles D.; and one daughter, Virginia H. McCormick.

Career
Shafer pursued a career in politics and became the State's Attorney for Mckenzie County from 1915 to 1919.   Serving as the Assistant Attorney General from 1921 to 1923, he took on a more prominent role in 1923 when he became the North Dakota Attorney General.  He served this position until 1929, after defeating incumbent Walter Maddock in the 1928 gubernatorial election. He served as the 16th Governor of North Dakota from 1929 to 1933. During his term, many profound events in the history of North Dakota occurred. The most severe problems facing the state during Shafer's administration were drought and low prices for agricultural products. To his credit, the State Mill and Elevator showed a good profit for the state under Shafer's direction, despite the weather and economic conditions. In 1930, the state capitol (former territorial capitol) burned down. A capital commission was formed to oversee the design and construction of the new capitol, and he was at the groundbreaking ceremony in 1932.

Death
Shafer retired from public life after losing the Republican primary election for U.S. Senate against incumbent Gerald P. Nye in 1932. He died in Bismarck, North Dakota, on August 13, 1948, at the age of 59.  He is buried at Saint Mary's Cemetery in Bismarck, North Dakota.

References

External links
 
National Governors Association

1888 births
1948 deaths
Republican Party governors of North Dakota
North Dakota Attorneys General
People from Mandan, North Dakota
Independent Voters Association state governors of the United States
20th-century American politicians